The Ter-Antonyan function parameterizes the energy spectra of primary cosmic rays in the "knee" region ( eV) by the continuously differentiable function of energy  taking into account the rate of change of spectral slope. The function is expressed as:

The rate of change of spectral slopes is set in function by the "sharpness of knee" parameter, . Function was proposed in ANI'98 Workshop (1998) 
by Samvel Ter-Antonyan 
for both the interpolation of primary energy spectra in the energy range 1—100 PeV and the search of parametrized solutions of inverse problem to reconstruct primary cosmic ray energy spectra. 
Function is also used for the interpolation of observed Extensive Air Shower spectra in the knee region.

Function can be re-written as:

where  and

is the “knee” shaping function describing the change of the spectral slope.
 

,

where

,

,

and

is the sharpness-independent spectral slope at the knee energy.

Function coincides with B. Peters
asymptotically approaches the broken power law of cosmic ray energy spectra for :
 
,

where

References 

Cosmic rays